Nationwide Building Society is a British mutual financial institution, the seventh largest cooperative financial institution and the largest building society in the world with over 16 million members. Its headquarters are in Swindon, England.

Nationwide is made up of around 250 different building societies. Among the most significant mergers were those with the Anglia Building Society in 1987 and the Portman Building Society in 2007. It is now the second largest provider of household savings and mortgages in the UK and has a 10.3% market share of current accounts for the 2021/2022 financial year.

For the financial year 2021/2022, Nationwide had assets of around £272.4 billion compared to £483 billion for the entire building society sector, making it larger than the remaining 42 British building societies combined.

It is a member of the Building Societies Association, the Council of Mortgage Lenders and Co-operatives UK.

History
The Society's origins lie in the Co-operative Permanent Building Society, founded in 1884. Based at New Oxford House, High Holborn, it changed its name in 1970 after deciding to leave the British Co-operative Union. The new name was put to a member vote, with members voting 135,675 to 15,585 in favour.

In 1987, the Northampton-based Anglia Building Society merged with Nationwide. The new society was known as Nationwide Anglia Building Society at first, but the Anglia name was dropped in 1991. In 1992, Nationwide moved its head office to Nationwide House, Pipers Way, Swindon. It had been operating a computer centre and administrative office in the town since 1974 and head office departments had been gradually migrating to Swindon.

Nationwide launched an early UK internet banking service on 27 May 1997.

In 1999, Nationwide, together with various UK tabloid newspapers and media, launched a campaign against controversial cash machine fees. The campaign reached a peak when Barclays Bank announced a plan to charge all customers of rival banks and financial providers, including those of Nationwide, £1 for every cash machine withdrawal made from a Barclays-owned cash machine. This prompted Nationwide to warn Barclays that it would take legal action against the bank if it did not back down. Nationwide claimed Barclays had broken the rules of the LINK network of cash machines, which the bank had joined earlier in the year. The following year, withdrawals from most cash machines owned by UK banks were made free for customers of all banks and building societies throughout the UK.

In 2007, Nationwide members voted at its Annual General Meeting to donate at least 1% of pre-tax profits to charitable activities each year. Nationwide completed a merger with Portman Building Society on 28 August 2007, creating a mutual body with assets of over £160 billion and around 13 million members. Portman's earliest component was the Provident Union Building Society founded in Ramsbury, Wiltshire in 1846. 

In the financial crisis of 2007–2008, the Nationwide acted to safeguard the mutual sector, acquiring the ailing Cheshire and Derbyshire building societies in September 2008, followed by the Dunfermline Building Society on 30 March 2009.

On 24 March 2009, Nationwide Building Society opened a direct savings branch in Dublin, Ireland called Nationwide UK (Ireland), to distinguish it from the unconnected and now-defunct Irish Nationwide Building Society. However, Nationwide ceased all operations in the Irish Republic in 2017.

In 2012, the Society announced that it would integrate the Cheshire, Derbyshire and Dunfermline building Societies into Nationwide. The Societies had operated under their own brands as divisions of the Society. The rebranding of each business was phased, with the Dunfermline first to be merged in June 2014. The Cheshire and Derbyshire followed in October and November 2014 respectively.

On 22 May 2015, it was announced that the Society's Chief Executive, Graham Beale, intended to retire. On 16 November 2015, Nationwide announced that Joe Garner, CEO of Openreach, would succeed Graham as Nationwide CEO in Spring 2016. Joe Garner joined the Society as Chief Executive on 5 April 2016.

In May 2016, the Society confirmed that it would be closing its subsidiary on the Isle of Man, Nationwide International, following a review of its business. The branch, based in Douglas, provided a range of offshore savings accounts in euros, pound sterling and US dollars. It held assets in excess of £2.76 billion as at 31 March 2008, increasing to £3.69 billion by 31 March 2009, making it one of the largest deposit takers in the Isle of Man. Nationwide confirmed it would close on 30 June 2017.

On 1 October 2016, Carillion began providing services for Nationwide's headquarters in Swindon, 'specifically aligned to Nationwide's sustainability strategy'. This contract was expected to be worth approximately £350 million, building on an existing partnership of nearly nine years. When Carillion went into liquidation in January 2018, Nationwide took on 297 staff previously employed by the contractor.

In April 2017, the Society confirmed that it would be closing its subsidiary on the Republic of Ireland, Nationwide UK (Ireland), following a review of its business. Its branch at 13 Merrion Row, Dublin 2 closed on 31 May 2017. The remainder of the business closed at the end of the year. Nationwide announced it would be building a new community at Oakfield in Swindon working in partnership with Swindon Borough Council. Planning permission for the 239 houses was granted in 2019. The homes will be EPC A rated and built on a not-for-profit model. In 2021 the development won the ‘Building for a Healthy Life’ prize as part of the Housing Design Awards.}}

In March 2022, Kevin Parry replaced David Roberts as Chairman; and in June 2022, Debbie Crosbie, who had been CEO of TSB Bank, succeeded Joe Garner, as Chief Executive.

Mutual status
Nationwide is committed to staying mutual and is keen to emphasise that it has members rather than shareholders. However, it has had challenges against its mutual status in the past.

Nationwide was by far the largest British building society that did not convert to a bank in the wave of demutualisations that occurred from the late 1980s to the late 1990s.

In 1998, society members seeking a windfall, branded as carpetbaggers by the UK media, meant Nationwide members had to vote on whether to demutualise the society and float on the London Stock Exchange. The attempt failed, despite media reports of possible pay-outs to members of around £1,000 to £1,500 each, as Nationwide members voted by a narrow margin of 33,700 against converting the building society into a bank.

Society members again proposed a resolution in 2001 for another vote by Nationwide members to convert the society to a bank. The resolution was rejected by the Nationwide board on legal grounds.

Controversies
In the wake of the financial crisis of 2007–08, executive pay practices came under increasing scrutiny at Nationwide as in the rest of the financial sector. The Building Society Members' Association began to campaign against acceptance of remuneration reports at AGMs in 2009, and with the CEO's compensation rising 45% to £2.25 million by 2012 the board's levels of pay attracted criticism in The Guardian, and The Huffington Post.

Nationwide has also had to pay out over £473 million of compensation to customers for the mis-selling of PPI.

Nationwide had to scrap its intentions to pursue a digital business current account in April 2020, due to the effects of the COVID-19 pandemic. The society has said the pandemic has driven down the medium-term interest rates, which the society believes has made the project unviable. Nationwide has committed to return the £50m grant from the Banking Competition Remedies scheme, which distributes funding that Royal Bank of Scotland was ordered to set aside as a condition of its 2009 bailout. The project is estimated to have cost members £70 million, but Nationwide have said that all staff working on the project will be redeployed elsewhere. It still provides some business savings accounts.

Products and services

Nationwide Building Society provides financial services both directly, and through around 700 branches. Nationwide is a major provider of both mortgage loans and savings in the UK, as well as personal banking such as loans, credit cards, bank accounts and insurance products.

Financial performance
For the 2015/2016 Preliminary Results (April 2015–April 2016), underlying profits were up 9% to £1.337 billion, while statutory profits rose by 23% to £1.279 billion. Cost income ratio was 53.9%. Common Equity Tier 1 and leverage ratios improved to 23.2% and 4.2%. Gross and net lending were at £32.6 billion and £9.1 billion respectively. Nationwide helped 57,200 people buy their first home.  Member deposits increased by £6.3 billion.

Credit rating
Nationwide's long term credit rating, as of the second half of 2022, was A1 with Moody's, A+ with Standard & Poor's and A+ with Fitch Ratings.

Subsidiaries
Nationwide owns several subsidiary companies, including:

Nationwide International Limited – offshore deposit taker
Nationwide Syndications Limited – syndicated lending
The Mortgage Works (UK) plc – specialised mortgage lender
UCB Home Loans Corporation Limited – specialised mortgage lender
Derbyshire Home Loans Limited – specialised mortgage lender
E-MEX Home Funding Limited – specialised mortgage lender

Key people
Group Chairman: David Roberts (since July 2015) 
Group Chief Executive: Debbie Crosbie (since June 2022)

List of chief executives 

 Charles Cooper (1884–1892)
 Arthur Webb (1892–1939)
 Harry Score (1939–1947)
 Stanley Lindsey (1947–1951)
 Sir Herbert Ashworth (1951–1961)
 Joe Simpson (1961–1967)
 Leonard Williams (1967–1981)
 Cyril English (1981–1985)
 Sir Timothy Melville-Ross (1985–1994)
 Brian Davis (1994–2001)
 Philip Williamson (2002–2007)
 Graham Beale (2007–2016)
 Joe Garner (2016–2022)
 Debbie Crosbie (2022–)

See also

Nationwide Group Staff Union

References

External links

 
 Nationwide Commercial
 Nationwide International
 Nationwide UK (Ireland)

Building societies of England
Buildings and structures in Swindon
Banks established in 1846
Companies based in Swindon
British companies established in 1846